The Ghetto Commission was a rap quartet signed to No Limit Records.

Biography
The Ghetto Commission was formed in 1998 in New Orleans, Louisiana, U.S. Members consisted of New Orleans rappers Holloway (Dwayne Lawrence), G-Spade (Gary Arnold), Valerio (Walter Valerio) and singer Byron Dolliole. The group made several guest appearances on No Limit releases from 1998 to 2000. They released their first and only album, Wise Guys, in 1998, which featured the non-charting single "I'm a Soulja". The album peaked at number 59 on the Billboard 200 and number 12 on the Top R&B/Hip-Hop Albums.

Ghetto Commission's last appearance for No Limit was on the 2000 single "We Bust" by 504 Boyz.

Discography

Singles

As lead artist

References

American hip hop groups
Southern hip hop groups
No Limit Records artists
Musical quartets
African-American musical groups
Musical groups established in 1998
Musical groups disestablished in 2005
Gangsta rap groups